Frederick Arthur Finch  (16 June 1945 – 12 November 2018) was an Australian politician, a Country Liberal Party member of the Northern Territory Legislative Assembly from 1983 to 1997, representing Wagaman until 1987 and Leanyer thereafter.

History
Finch was born in Port Kembla, New South Wales. He graduated from the University of Wollongong in 1969 with a Bachelor of Science degree in Civil Engineering and then worked at the Sydney Water Board. In 1974 Finch moved to Darwin, Northern Territory, where he became partner in a firm of consulting engineers. He was involved in a professional capacity with reconstruction efforts following Cyclone Tracy.

He was a prominent member of Lions Clubs Australia: an active member of the Lions Club of Darwin Casuarina for around 20 years, serving as President and in many other responsible positions both locally and at a District level, notably Zone Chairman (twice) and Deputy District Governor 201S3 (twice).

Political career

|}
In 1984, Finch, encouraged by the Chief Minister Paul Everingham, won a legislative seat as a member of the Country Liberal Party.

Finch served as a minister in the Hatton, Perron and Stone governments, serving as Minister for Transport and Works (1987–1992), Minister for Racing and Gaming (1989–1990, 1996–1997), Minister for Education and Training (1992–1995, 1996–1997), Minister for Public Employment (1992–1994, 1995–1997), Attorney-General (1994–1995), Minister for Health Services (1995–1996) and Minister for the Liquor Commission (1995–1996).

Recognition
He was around 2000 appointed Honorary Lion by his old club, Darwin Casuarina.
In January 2007, Finch was made a Member of the Order of Australia for his "service to the community of the Northern Territory."

References

1945 births
2018 deaths
Members of the Northern Territory Legislative Assembly
Country Liberal Party members of the Northern Territory Legislative Assembly
Members of the Order of Australia